Jayasundara Mudiyanselage Ananda Kumarasiri (born 25 March 1954) is a member of the United National Party and served as Deputy speaker and chairman of committees of the Parliament of Sri Lanka between 2018 and 2020. He is the son of late J M Kumaradasa, the first sitting member of parliament representing Wellawaya, who spearheaded the rapid development of the Monaragala District under then President J.R. Jayawardena.  Hon Ananda Kumarasiri is currently the  Member of Parliament for the Monaragala District.

Member of the 11th Parliament of Sri Lanka (2000–2001)

Member of the 12th Parliament of Sri Lanka (2001–2004)

References 

Sinhalese politicians
United National Party politicians
Living people
Sri Lankan Buddhists
1954 births